Richard O. Biondi (born September 13, 1932) is an American Top 40 and Oldies disc jockey. Calling himself The Wild I-tralian, he was one of the original "screamers," known for his screaming delivery as well as wild antics on the air and off. In a 1988 interview, Biondi said he had been fired 23 times, with both fits of temper and jokes gone wrong part of the tally. Over many years and many frequencies, Dick's closing line was, "God bless, bye, bye, Duke. Thanks a million for dialing our way."

Biondi gained national attention in the 1950s and 1960s as a disc jockey on leading AM radio stations in Buffalo, New York; Chicago, Illinois; and Los Angeles, California. Besides being among the first to play Elvis Presley, Jerry Lee Lewis, Gene Vincent, and other early rhythm and blues artists, he was also able to meet them. The early Rock and Roll era meant "record hops" where disc jockeys would make personal appearances at local schools and clubs; they often included appearances by the artists whose records were being played. Biondi is credited as the first U.S. disc jockey to play the Beatles, on Chicago's WLS 890 AM in February 1963, with the song "Please Please Me". Later, while working at KRLA (1110 AM) in Los Angeles, he introduced the Beatles and Rolling Stones at their Hollywood Bowl concerts.

Since 1984, Biondi has been a mainstay on oldies stations in the city where he first earned his reputation, Chicago. On May 2, 2010, Dick Biondi celebrated the 50th anniversary of his first Chicago broadcast. WLS-AM and WLS-FM presented a 5-hour simulcast special from 7 p.m. to midnight, featuring memorable moments in his career and special celebrity guests, with Biondi as host.

Biondi is an inductee of the Radio Hall of Fame (Chicago).

Career

1940s–1950s
Biondi was born and raised in Endicott, New York. His lifelong love of radio began at an early age, when he was allowed to read a commercial on WMBO in Auburn, New York.  His father, Mike, an Endicott fireman, and mother, Rose, encouraged him in his goal; at the time it was to become a sportscaster.  He went on to work behind the scenes and learned about broadcasting at nearby WINR, Binghamton, New York, where one of his co-workers was a young Rod Serling.  Another co-worker, himself a sportcaster, took an interest in the young Biondi and began working with him on pronunciation and diction.  As a sportscaster, Biondi began his on-air career in radio on WCBA 1350 AM in Corning, New York.  He continued on to KVOB, Bastrop, Louisiana, but it wasn't until working for KSYL in Alexandria that Biondi started doing music shows.  It was here where he became acquainted with Rhythm and blues.  Career moves took him to York, Pennsylvania, and WHOT-AM, Youngstown, Ohio.   When Biondi arrived there, Rock and Roll was on the airwaves, and he began doing local appearances with such stars as Fabian, Paul Anka, and Bobby Darin.

At a 1956 Cleveland Elvis Presley concert, Biondi had Elvis sign the shirt he was wearing.  When Biondi returned to the crowd, Presley's frenzied female fans started tearing away at it.  Biondi was hospitalized, to the amusement of Elvis.

He was hired in 1958 by WKBW (1520 AM) in Buffalo; at WKBW if conditions were right, Biondi could be heard in Europe. After a dispute at WKBW, Biondi jokingly described his boss's car on the air, said where he would be driving, and asked his listeners to throw rocks at it.  Someone did as Biondi asked, and he was fired the next day. He worked at WEBR in Buffalo before gaining fame in 1960 on Chicago's 50,000 watt WLS, which covered most of the United States east of the Continental Divide.

1960s–1970s
To promote the WLS "Bright New Sound" which premiered May 2, 1960, ABC executives did some advance publicity by bringing two of its new personalities to Chicago early. Biondi and colleague Bob Hale made the media and music rounds. After their first big day as the representatives of the new WLS, they returned to the station that evening to begin asking for and taking collect phone calls from any point in the US.  Calls came in from across the country as well as from a couple of ships at sea. Biondi recalls the first record he played on the new WLS was "Teddy Bear" by Elvis. Many record company executives considered him to be a vital part of the hitmaking process.  Biondi's playing a record on his show gave it maximum exposure to a very large listening audience; he was the most popular night time DJ in the Midwest. There was a lot of fun at WLS; in response to the record, "There Was Fungus Among Us", Dick issued his listeners "Fungus Licenses".

In 1961 he made a record, "On Top of a Pizza" (a parody of "On Top of Old Smoky"), that became a local hit. The flip side of the record is "Knock Knock", a nod to the jokes Dick told on the air so often. (e.g., "Knock knock." "Who's there?" "Biondi." "Biondi who?" "Biondi Blue Horizon.") In 1963, Biondi left WLS over a dispute involving the number of commercials on his radio show. Rumors and urban legends still persist that Biondi told an obscene joke on the air which resulted in his being fired. Part of Biondi's hiatus from radio was spent making a record album, Dick Biondi's Favorites-the Teenagers with Ray Stevens. He moved to KRLA, then the No. 1 Top 40 station in the Los Angeles market. At KRLA, Biondi was in good company working with other legendary radio personalities, including Bob Eubanks, Casey Kasem, Emperor Bob Hudson and Dave Hull. Not long after arriving there, Dick created The Dick Biondi Road Show which brought new acts to perform at high schools all over Southern California.

In 1964–65, between KRLA stints, he hosted a nationally syndicated show, Dick Biondi's Young America, carried by 125 stations on the Mutual Broadcasting System. Through this program, Dick was heard on WCFL 3 years prior to his signing with the station. During his time with the Mutual show, Biondi obtained exclusivity rights for records for all of his subscriber stations; this was a big boost to their ability to be competitive in smaller radio markets. He returned to KRLA in early 1965, soon after the Mutual show was cancelled.

Biondi returned to Chicago on WCFL (1000 AM) in 1967. In addition to his regular airshift, Dick also did many specialty shows for WCFL: Pop Goes the Music and In the Beginning were looks back at early Rock and Roll; This Is Elvis explored the life of Elvis Presley, while Dick Biondi Labels the Blues delved into that aspect of music and the influence it had on Rock and Roll. Dick Biondi and Friend was an interview program featuring then current popular music stars.  There was also the weekly "Vietnam Show" that allowed listeners to send greetings to family and friends serving overseas; copies went to Armed Forces Radio Network.

In 1972, after a short time at WMAQ (AM), he left Chicago once again, working at WBZ Boston, WSAI Cincinnati, and a decade-long stint on WNMB in North Myrtle Beach, South Carolina. Beginning in 1976, during his time at WNMB, Dick produced a syndicated program called Dick Biondi's Super Gold Rock and Roll which was syndicated to about 60 radio stations. WNMB began rebroadcasting the shows on February 3, 2010.

1980s-present
In the early 1980s, former WLS DJ Bob Sirott was a reporter for WBBM-TV.  He did an ongoing feature show called, Where Are They Now? which located and interviewed former famous Chicagoans who had slipped from local prominence. Dick was the subject of a Where Are They Now? show in 1982; it was enough to rekindle local radio professional interest in him and Biondi returned to Chicago the next year-briefly working at WBBM (96.3 FM). In 1984, he was the signature voice for the launch of the new Oldies station WJMK (104.3 FM), where he was heard until the station switched formats in June 2005. Biondi, along with the Oldies format, was kept on a digital subcarrier HD2, but he was released in July 2006, along with all other on-air personalities. In November 2006, Biondi started on WLS (94.7 FM), where he hosted from 11 p.m. to 2 a.m. Central Time (formerly from 7 p.m. to 11 p.m.). In November 2015, his show was moved to weekend mornings. Columbia College, Chicago presented Inside the Radio Studio with Dick Biondi & Herb Kent-100 Years on the Air on April 10, 2010. Both men were on the air until Kent passed away on October 22, 2016.

In May 2017, Biondi released a statement declaring his intention to return to air after reportedly recovering from a leg ailment for which he was hospitalized.

In May 2018, WLS-FM confirmed that Biondi is no longer employed by the station.

Awards and recognition
In 1961, while at WLS, Biondi received the Gavin Top 40 Disc Jockey of the Year Award. In 1966, when he was at KRLA, he was Billboard's most popular late evening DJ. In 1995, Biondi was honored in an exhibit at the Rock and Roll Hall of Fame along with other legendary disc jockeys. He was inducted into the Radio Hall of Fame in 1998, with the message, "He's an okay guy." In 2011, Biondi was inducted into the Southern Tier Broadcasters Hall of Fame and the Buffalo Broadcasting Hall of Fame.

Illinois Governor Pat Quinn proclaimed May 1, 2010 "Dick Biondi Day" in Illinois. The Chicago City Council also honored Biondi's longevity in Chicago radio by naming a street in his honor, "Dick Biondi Way". His ambition is to become the oldest active Rock and Roll disc jockey in the US. Biondi has said "I'd like to die with my earphones on."

References

External links
Dick Biondi at the Radio Hall of Fame
Cruisin' 1960 at reelradio.com

1932 births
Living people
American radio DJs
American people of Italian descent
Radio personalities from Chicago
People from Endicott, New York
Radio personalities from Buffalo, New York
Radio personalities from Los Angeles